Church of the Ascension is an Anglican church in Ottawa, Ontario, Canada. The church is located at 253 Echo Dr. Church services are held on Sundays from 10 a.m. to 11:30 a.m.

History
The original Anglican parish was established in 1877. To enable parishioners living west of the canal to get to church on Sundays, the parish kept a row boat and ferryman.

A new Arts and Crafts style church was built in 1916 and dedicated as Church of the Ascension in 1920.
The features include Parish Hall and the stained glass windows, some of which were salvaged from the original church. The Church participated in the 2012 Doors Open Ottawa.

References

External links

Anglican Diocese of Ottawa

Anglican church buildings in Ottawa

mk:Христова катедрала (Отава)